GU Energy Labs is a company based in Berkeley, California, that produces performance sports nutrition products, most notably energy gels. Usually consumed during endurance events, the gels are designed to be quickly and easily digested. Other products include energy chews, drink mixes, hydration tablets, stroopwafels and a Roctane line that includes an energy drink mix, protein recovery drink mix, gel, and capsules. The company was founded in 1994 by Bill Vaughan, who began creating an energy gel product in 1990. GU is considered the first major distributor of energy gels. The company has grown over time, and in 2011 its corporate headquarters and 50 employees relocated to a larger space in Berkeley's 4th Street shopping district. It is now run by Bill's son, Brian Vaughan, who serves as president.

Background and company history
Sports energy gels emerged in the United Kingdom in 1986 as a "convenient, prewrapped, portable" way to deliver carbohydrates during endurance events. Gels have a gooey texture and are sometimes referred to as "goo" generically. Bill Vaughan, a biophysicist at University of California, Berkeley, began working on an energy gel product in 1990. He established GU Energy Labs in Berkeley, California, in 1994. GU Energy Labs is regarded as the first major distributor of energy gels, supplying products at the Ironman World Championship in 1996. GU is now run by Bill's son, Brian Vaughan, who serves as president.

In June 2011, GU moved its corporate operations and 50 employees from a  space to one with twice as much floor space. The larger,  space, located in Berkeley's 4th Street shopping district, affords the company an increased production capacity, with room for additional growth. GU's 2011 relocation was the first time in five years that all of its employees operated from a single location; previously, the company's operations, shipping, and marketing were executed from multiple buildings throughout Berkeley. GU outsourced its shipping operations to a third party provider, "for improved service and response times".

Products
GU Energy Labs produces a variety of performance sports nutrition products, intended to increase the endurance of athletes. Its products include GU Energy Gel, energy chews, drink mixes, hydration tabs, stroopwafels and a line of Roctane products. Their energy gel contains carbohydrates (maltodextrin and fructose), an amino acid blend, electrolytes (sodium and potassium) and, in some flavors, caffeine. Gel packets provide 100 calories and come in a variety of flavors, including triberry, chocolate outrage, mandarin orange, mint chocolate, salted caramel, strawberry banana, and vanilla. The energy chews, created in 2009 and based on the gel formula, are made from similar ingredients but also include antioxidants and come in a chewable form.

GU produces three drink products: the GU Roctane Energy Drink Mix and the GU Roctane Protein Recovery Drink Mix. The Roctane Protein Recovery Drink Mix, designed for consumption following physical activity, was created in 2009 and includes amino acids, antioxidants, carbohydrates, and protein. GU Hydration Tablets contain a low-calorie sweetening agent derived from Stevia.

GU's Roctane line, introduced in 2008, includes an energy gel, energy drink mix, protein recovery drink mix, and capsules. The drink formula contains caffeine (in most flavors), beta-Alanine, taurine, and additional amino acids. Compared to GU's original energy gel, servings of Roctane energy gel contains three times more branched-chain amino acids, more electrolytes, and ten times more histidine.

Sponsorships
The company sponsors numerous triathlon, swimming, biking, running and outdoor athletes in order to promote its products, including the Brazilian team at the 2010 FIFA World Cup, USA Triathlon, TriGrandPrix, the Rock 'n' Roll Marathon Series, Western States Endurance Run, and the Leadville Race Series. In 2012, the company became the first official gel and chew sponsor for Ironman. In 2013, in conjunction with the Challenged Athletes Foundation, GU established the "Challenge for Kids" campaign to benefit children suffering from amputation maladies, including traumatic limb loss, congenital effects, and "disease-state" complications. The company created a special edition passionfruit flavor for its Roctane line; profits from the product would allow the purchase of prosthetics, allowing children to regain mobility. GU increased its goal to $100,000, having surpassed its original goal of $50,000. The company has also supported the National Interscholastic Cycling Association, an organization that promotes high school mountain biking.

See also 
 Energy bar
 Sports drink

References

External links 
 
 
 
 

1994 establishments in California
Companies based in Berkeley, California
American companies established in 1994
Dietary supplements
Energy food products
Food and drink in the San Francisco Bay Area
Sports in the San Francisco Bay Area
Food and drink companies based in California